Mario Ernesto López Quintana (born 6 July 1995) is a Paraguayan footballer that currently plays for Argentine club Aldosivi.

Club career
After starting playing for hometown teams (Cerro Corá and Valois Rivarola) he joined Cerro Porteño football academy in 2008. After spending three years at Asunción-based side, López moved to Argentina for play at Gimnasia y Esgrima La Plata youth set-up.

In the winter of 2014, López joined Primera División de Chile side Santiago Wanderers and made his professional debut against San Marcos de Arica coming on as a substitute after replacing Jorge Luna. His first competitive goal came on 21 March 2015 in a 3–3 away draw with the same San Marcos de Arica, now at the Estadio Carlos Dittborn.

On 10 January 2020, López signed with Argentine club Aldosivi.

References

External links
 
 

1995 births
Living people
Paraguayan footballers
Paraguayan expatriate footballers
Chilean Primera División players
Santiago Wanderers footballers
Aldosivi footballers
Association football defenders
Paraguayan expatriate sportspeople in Argentina
Paraguayan expatriate sportspeople in Chile
Expatriate footballers in Argentina
Expatriate footballers in Chile